License fee may mean:

a fee paid for a license in general
a fee paid for a television licence (most common usage of this phrase in the United Kingdom)
License Fee (horse), a racehorse